Christopher Naylor is a British actor.  He has appeared on TV in Warriors (1999), Bugs (1999), Sweet Revenge (2001), In Love with Barbara (2008) and onstage in a 2007 regional tour of Hay Fever. In 2009 he starred in the West End stage production of The Woman in Black at the Fortune Theatre.

External links

Living people
Year of birth missing (living people)
British male television actors
British male stage actors